Club Deportivo Cuenca is an Ecuadorian football club based in Cuenca. They currently play in the Serie A, the top-flight football league in the country, and is one of two clubs from Cuenca to have played in the top-flight (the other being LDU Cuenca).

Historically an undistinguished club in Ecuador, they have had a recent string of success in Serie A. They are one of three clubs outside Quito and Guayaquil to have a national championship, which they won in 2004. Since then, they have been a near consistent top club in the country, including numerous Copa Libertadores participations.

Deportivo Cuenca was founded on March 4, 1971, and is the second oldest club in the city after Tecni Club. Their home stadium is Estadio Alejandro Serrano Aguilar, which was named after former club president and mayor of Cuenca. Because of the limited number of clubs from the Province of Azuay that have played in the Serie A, Deportivo Cuenca has no major local rivals.

History

Foundation
In 1970 the desire was born to form a professional soccer team in the city of Cuenca. This desire was shaped through Dr. Alejandro Serrano Aguilar (mayor of the city then) and the gentlemen Polivio Vázquez and Alfredo Pena. The citizen's endorsement was immediate before the initiative headed by the mayor, therefore the Commission of Sports was satisfied to the gentlemen Gilbert Sotomayor, Ricardo Ordóñez and Bolívar Lupercio, whose first management was to obtain the acceptance of the Ecuadorian Federation of Soccer so that the professional team of the city could participate in the professional level. By means of the session celebrated in February 1971 in the "Salón de la Ciudad" of the Very Illustrious Municipality of Cuenca, the project became a reality, and it was then that Deportivo Cuenca was born. A month later, the Association of Soccer funded the Asociación de Fútbol no Amateur del Azuay (AFA) (Association of Soccer non-Amateur of Azuay). As a club the first decisions were taken: the uniform would be red and yellow with a T-shirt to vertical rays, the first Technical Director was Carlos Alberto Raffo, the first contracted foreign soccer players were Rodolfo Piazza, the Paraguayan Luis Martínez who achieved the first team's goal, and Gerald Laterza. In its start, the team was known as the "Franela Roja" (Red Bandana).

Historical performance
Originally, and throughout most of its existence, the team was never a contender to the title, and never received much attention internationally, such as in the prestigious Copa Libertadores. Deportivo Cuenca had a brief successful period during the 1970s, becoming runner-up twice in 1975 & 1976. The favorable finishes allowed them to participate in the next year's Copa Libertadores. Throughout the 1980s and 1990s, the club was in-and-out of the second tier Serie B. They returned to Serie A in 2003, and in 2004, they became the second club outside Quito or Guayaquil to win the national championship. Since then, they have finished in the top three in three of four seasons, allowing them to participate in five of the past six Copa Libertadores.

Colors and badge
Deportivo Cuenca's historical kit has been red shirts with black shorts. Alternate kits, like most teams in Ecuador, varied from year to year. The badge of the team includes elements of the seal of the city of Cuenca.

Championship Year
In 2004, Deportivo Cuenca would win its first championship in its history. The process began with Argentine coach Daniel Córdoba, who joined the club's Javier Klimowicz, Marcelo Velazco, and national Giancarlos Ramos. After a successful first stage, halfway through the league, coach Cordoba abandoned Cuenca already qualified for the playoffs and contracted its replacement Julio "Turco" Asad.
The title was secured on December 8 of 2004, with two games left in the tournament, when Deportivo Cuenca with 19.5 points, was unreachable for Barcelona and Olmedo who were runner up. That day Cuenca won 3–2 to Aucas in Quito, but the celebration began after the end of the game between El Nacional, and LDU Quito. The tie produced between those competitors allowed the Morlacos to be unreachable. Fans took to the streets to celebrate, thousands of vehicles blew their horns, with explosions of rockets and fireworks in the sky. The conquest had caused such joy in the fans that it forced the opening of the stadium where thousands of fans cheered the team. Prior to that there was a motorcade from the airport to the Alejandro Serrano Aguilar Stadium.

Nicknames
The club has several nicknames, the best known is "Morlacos", and "Expresso Austral" (Southern Express), the first is because people belonging to the city of Cuenca are commonly called so, the second was placed by the national press in the 1970s due to the campaigns being undertaken by the team, calling the team the southern train, a southern Express, as a visual depiction of overpassing its opponents.

It is also popularly called "Red" because of its kit shirt. The club was well known in its infancy, as "Red Flannel" because of the fabric and the color of their clothing. It is less commonly recognized as the "lion" because this is also the symbol of the city and is present in the emblem of the institution.

Honors
 National
 Serie A: 2004
 Serie B: 1972 E2, 1995

Records
In Serie A:

 Seasons: 34
 All-time position: 6
 Best finish: 1st (2004)
 Worst finish: 8th (2006)
 Biggest win: 6–0 vs. Green Cross 
 Biggest defeat: 6–2 vs. Macará 
 Top scorer: Ángel Luis Liciardi (132 goals)

Players

Current squad

Out on loan

Top goalscorers

Deportivo Cuenca has had two players become the top scorer of the Serie A, with one player repeating the feat. The club's all-time top goalscorer is Ángel Luis Liciardi with 132 goals.

  Ángel Luis Liciardi (1974; 19 goals)
  Ángel Luis Liciardi (1975; 36 goals)
  Ángel Luis Liciardi (1976; 35 goals)
  Juan Carlos Ferreyra (2007; 17 goals)

Managers

Notable managers
Argentine Julio Asad is the only manager to win a title with Deportivo Cuenca, who led them to the Serie A title in 2004.

References

External links

 
Deportivo Cuenca's profile 

 
Football clubs in Ecuador
Association football clubs established in 1971
Cuenca, Ecuador
1971 establishments in Ecuador